José Joaquim Champalimaud de Nussane de Sousa Lira e Castro de Barbosa (Valença, Fontoura 4 October 1771 — Portalegre, Elvas 5 May 1825) was a Portuguese marshal.

History
He was son of a lieutenant colonel Paulo José Champalimaud de Nussane (engineer of Praça de Valença) and Clara Maria de Sousa Lyra e Castra, originated from the parish Ferreira, the municipality of Paredes de Coura.

Born in 1771, José Joaquim enlisted, still a child, in the 21st Infantry Regiment, who manned Valença. 
At nineteen years he became a cadet in Porto. 
In 1791 he was already an officer, and the following year he was promoted to second lieutenant and assigned to the Companhia de Brulotes da Marinha.

He fought Moroccan Buccaneers in the Strait of Gibraltar, when he belonged to the crew of the frigate Dom João - Príncipe do Brasil.

Promoted to captain (1797), was placed again in the 21st Infantry Regiment. 
He directed the works of fortification in Minho and made the campaign of 1801, resigning in 1807, when Junot entered the country, not wanting to serve in foreign armed forces.

When the resistance against the French broke out, he had the rank of major. 
He took an active part in the fight, and was soon promoted to the rank of lieutenant colonel, in 1808.

In 1812, after a brilliant record of service in the military, is appointed governor of the fortress of Valença, and later of Elvas. 
In 1815 he was promoted to marshal (marechal de campo).

References

19th-century Portuguese people
Portuguese military commanders of the Napoleonic Wars
18th-century Portuguese people
1771 births
1825 deaths